Josh Smith (born 2 January 1994) is an Australian rules footballer who played for the West Coast Eagles in the Australian Football League (AFL). 

Smith was first eligible to be drafted in 2012.

Originally from Brisbane and working in childcare, Smith was drafted by Collingwood with their 2nd pick of the 2016 rookie draft.

AFL career

Collingwood (2016-2018)
Smith made his debut for Collingwood on 25 April 2016 for the annual Anzac Day clash against Essendon scored his first goal in the match. Collingwood won the match by 69 points. Following his debut, he didn't miss a single match for the rest of the season, playing 18 games. At the end of the season he managed to place 7th in the best & fairest and was awarded the Harry Collier Trophy as the best first year player.

At the conclusion of the 2018 season, in which he played only one game, Smith was delisted by Collingwood.

West Coast (2019)
In the 2018 Draft period, Josh Smith was handed a lifeline being drafted as a rookie by the West Coast Eagles. Smith made his debut for the Eagles in their Round 2 52 point win against GWS. He kicked one goal and one behind and had 13 disposals. He then got dropped after that game and didn’t play until Round 17. In Round 17 he played in their 45 point loss to Sydney. He had 13 disposals.

Statistics

Statistics are correct to the end of the 2019 season

|- style="background-color: #eaeaea"
! scope="row" style="text-align:center" | 2016
|
| 40 || 18 || 4 || 2 || 198 || 176 || 374 || 85 || 43 || 0.2 || 0.1 || 11.0 || 9.8 || 20.8 || 4.7 || 2.4
|- 
! scope="row" style="text-align:center" | 2017
|
| 40 || 13 || 2 || 0 || 185 || 70 || 255 || 86 || 30 || 0.2 || 0.0 || 14.2 || 5.4 || 19.6 || 6.6 || 2.3
|- style="background-color: #eaeaea"
! scope="row" style="text-align:center" | 2018
|
| 40 || 1 || 0 || 1 || 7 || 7 || 14 || 3 || 3 || 0.0 || 1.0 || 7.0 || 7.0 || 14.0 || 3.0 || 3.0
|- style=:background#EAEAEA
| 2019 ||  || 45
| 2 || 1 || 1 || 13 || 10 || 23 || 9 || 0 || 0.5 || 0.5 || 6.5 || 5.0 || 11.5 || 4.5 || 0.0
|- class="sortbottom"
! colspan=3| Career
! 34
! 7
! 4
! 403
! 263
! 666
! 183
! 76
! 0.2
! 0.1
! 12.2
! 7.9
! 20.1
! 5.4
! 2.4
|}

References

External links

Living people
1994 births
Collingwood Football Club players
Redland Football Club players
Australian rules footballers from Queensland
West Coast Eagles players
West Coast Eagles (WAFL) players